The Zazi, also spelled Zazai, or Jaji, is a Karlani Afghan tribe. They are found in Paktia and Khost provinces in the Loya Paktia region of southeastern Afghanistan, as well as Kurram Valley of Pakistan, but also have an effective presence in Kabul, Logar, Ghazni, Nangharhar, Kunduz, and Baghlan in Afghanistan.

Ethnicity and geography
The Zazi are Sunni Muslims. The tribe is inhabited in four major geographic locations in Afghanistan and Pakistan:

Aryob Zazi: in Paktia province 
Ahmad Khel : in Paktia province 
Dand Pathan: in Paktia province
Kabul: in Kabul province
Maidan Zazi: district in Khost province
Kwarma (Kurram) Zazi: District Kurram in the Federally Administered Tribal Areas

Notable Zazi
Qutbuddin Hilal, Deputy Prime Minister of Afghanistan during the period of Mujahideen (Gulbuddin Hekmatyar) and member of Hezbi Islami from Zazi Maidan district.
Nabi Misdaq, founder of BBC Pashto service.
Najibullah Zazi (born 1985), Afghan-born man imprisoned in the US for terrorist offenses; father is Mohammed Wali Zazi.
Mustafa Zazai* (born 1993), professional footballer.

See also
 Aryob
 Loya Paktia

References

Karlani Pashtun tribes